Buhrer v Tweedie [1973] 1 NZLR 517 is a cited case in New Zealand regarding where a contract is offered subject to a condition, the contract is not completed until that condition has been met.

References

Court of Appeal of New Zealand cases
1973 in New Zealand law
1973 in case law